Luis Rojas may refer to:

Luis Rojas (footballer, born 1954), Chilean football midfielder
Luis Rojas (Venezuelan footballer) (born 1963), Venezuelan football defender
Luis Rojas (swimmer) (born 1979), Venezuelan Olympic swimmer
Luis Rojas (baseball) (born 1981), Dominican baseball coach
Luis Rojas (footballer, born 2002), Chilean football midfielder

See also
Luis Rojas Mena (1917–2009), Mexican bishop of the Roman Catholic Church.